Senator Young may refer to:

United States Senate
Lafayette Young (1848–1926), U.S. Senator from Iowa from 1910 to 1911
Milton Young (1897–1983), U.S. Senator from North Dakota from 1945 to 1981
Richard M. Young (1798–1861), U.S. Senator from Illinois from 1837 to 1843
Stephen M. Young (1889–1984), U.S. Senator from Ohio from 1959 until 1971
Todd Young (born 1972), U.S. Senator from Indiana since 2017

U.S. state senates
Anthony W. Young (1866–1948), Florida Senate
Austin H. Young (1830–1905), Wisconsin Senate
Bill Young (Florida politician) (1930–2013), Florida Senate
Catharine Young (politician) (born 1960), New York Senate
Clarence Clifton Young (1922–2016), Nevada Senate
Cornelius T. Young (1908–1980), Wisconsin Senate
Dana Young (born 1964), Florida Senate
David Young III (1905–?), New Jersey Senate
Don Young (born 1933), Alaska Senate
Edward T. Young (1858–1940), Minnesota Senate
Fred A. Young (1904–1973), New York Senate
George M. Young (1870–1932), North Dakota Senate
Horace C. Young (1806–1879), New York Senate
Isaac D. Young (1849–1927), Kansas Senate
James Young (Missouri politician) (1800–1878), Missouri Senate
Larry Young (politician) (born 1949), Maryland Senate
Milas K. Young (1812–1875), Wisconsin Senate
R. Michael Young (born 1951), Indiana Senate
Richard D. Young (born 1942), Indiana Senate
Robert D. Young (politician) (1934–2013), Michigan Senate
Ronald N. Young (born 1940), Maryland Senate
Samuel Young (New York politician) (1779–1850), New York Senate
Sanborn Young (1873–1964), California Senate
Thomas L. Young (1832–1888), Ohio Senate
William Young (Wisconsin politician) (1821–1890), Wisconsin Senate